Corydalus amazonas is a species of dobsonfly in the genus Corydalus. It is endemic to Brazil.

References 

Corydalidae
Insects of South America
Insects described in 1998